This is a list of Danish football transfers for the 2009-10 winter transfer window. Only moves featuring at least one Danish Superliga club are listed.

The winter break of the Danish Superliga 2009-10 season was from 7 December 2009 to 6 March 2010. The winter transfer window opened on 1 January 2010, although a few transfers took place prior to that date; carry-overs from the summer 2009 transfer window. The window closed at midnight on 1 February 2010.

Transfers

Notes
 The player officially joined his new club on 1 January 2010.
 In Major League Soccer, all player contracts are owned by the league, not by individual teams.
 The deal went through during the transfer window of the Norwegian Premier League.
 The deal went through during the transfer window of the Swedish Allsvenskan.

References

Danish
2009-10
2009–10 in Danish football